Brad or Bradley Stone may refer to:

 Brad Stone (journalist) (born 1971), American journalist and writer
 Brad "Baruch" Stone, set up New Waveland Clinic, a temporary emergency clinic
 Bradley Stone (boxer) on List of deaths due to injuries sustained in boxing
 Bradley M. Stone, Scientist and Radio personality
 Bradley William Stone, perpetrator of the 2014 Montgomery County shootings

See also
Stone (surname)